Hugenholtz is a Dutch patrician family.

History
The family starts with Petrus Bernardus Hugenholtz, teacher at the Latin school in Wetter (Ruhr) who died in 1736.  His grandson, the reverend Petrus Hermannus Hugenholtz (1728-1766) moved to the Netherlands.

Notable members
Jan Albert Hendrik Hugenholtz (1825–1874), colonial official.
John Hugenholtz (1914–1995), race track designer.
Nicolaas Marinus Hugenholtz (born 1924), physicist

Literature
Nederland's Patriciaat 14 (1924).

Dutch patrician families